Shumen Municipality is a municipality (obshtina) in Shumen Province, Northeastern Bulgaria. It is named after its administrative centre - the city of Shumen which is also the capital of the province.

Currently, the eastern operating section of Hemus motorway  connects the main town with the port of Varna.

Aside from the rich cultural landmarks of the main city, the area is most known with the National Historical and Archaeological Reserve that includes the famous Madara Rider near the homonymous village.

Settlements 

Shumen Municipality includes the following 27 places (towns are shown in bold):

Demography 
The following table shows the change of the population during the last four decades. Since 1992 Shumen Municipality has comprised the former municipality of Ivanski and the numbers in the table reflect this unification.

Ethnic composition
According to the 2011 census, among those who answered the optional question on ethnic identification, the ethnic composition of the municipality was the following:

Religion
According to the latest Bulgarian census of 2011, the religious composition, among those who answered the optional question on religious identification, was the following:

See also
Provinces of Bulgaria
Municipalities of Bulgaria
List of cities and towns in Bulgaria

References

External links
 Official website 

Municipalities in Shumen Province